The Peruvian Football Federation ( or ) is the body that governs Association football in Peru. It was founded on August 23, 1922, and affiliated in 1924. A member of CONMEBOL since 1925, it directly oversees the Peru national football team, the Copa Federación, and the amateur leagues.

It is indirectly involved in the organization of the Primera División (today Liga 1), the Liga Femenina and Liga 2. It is headquartered in the Villa Deportiva Nacional (VIDENA) on Aviación Avenue 2085 in San Luis, Lima.

Association staff

See also 
 Football in Peru

References

External links
  Federación Peruana de Fútbol Website
Peru at FIFA site

Peru
Football in Peru
Football
Sports organizations established in 1922
1922 establishments in Peru